Lagerfeld is a surname. Notable people with the surname include:

 Karl Lagerfeld (1933–2019), German fashion designer, artist and photographer
 Otto Lagerfeld (1881–1967), German businessman
 Steven Lagerfeld, editor of The Wilson Quarterly

See also
 Lagerfelt

Swedish-language surnames